Vila Bela da Santíssima Trindade is a Brazilian municipality in Mato Grosso with 16,271 (2020) inhabitants. It is located at upper Guaporé River close to the border with Bolivia. It served as the capital of the Captaincy of Mato Grosso from 1752 to 1820.

Today, because most inhabitants descend from former African slaves, the town creates the impression of a town in the African jungle rather than in one in the Amazon jungle. The distinct African feeling is also reflected in a yearly festival called  Festa do Congo. One of its main events is the Dança do Congo, which is performed at the ruins of the former igreja matriz — a particular type of colonial Portuguese church. Aside from those church ruins, which are the main tourist site of the town, there is a small history museum.

The town serves as a hub for trips to the Amazon jungle along the upper Guaporé River and the nearby nature reserve Parque Estadual da Serra de Ricardo Franco. One of the main attractions of the latter is the  Cascata dos Namorados (English: Valentine Cascades).

The municipality contains the  Serra Ricardo Franco State Park, created in 1997.

Notes

External links

Pantanal Escapes - Travel Guide and Tourism in Vila Bela da Santíssima Trindade
Vila Bela da Santíssima Trindade - entry at the  community pages of the state Mato Grosso
VILA BELA DA SANTISSIMA TRINDADE - 1º Capital de Mato Grosso – blog entry with information and pictures of Vila Bela and its surroundings
Vila Bela da Santíssima Trindade - pictures of Vila Bela and its surroundings at Panoramio

Municipalities in Mato Grosso
Ruins in Brazil